Ernst Weber (September 6, 1901 in Vienna, Austria – February 16, 1996 in Columbus, North Carolina), Austria-born American electrical engineer, was a pioneer in microwave technologies and played an important role in the history of the New York University Tandon School of Engineering, where in 1945 he founded the Microwave Research Institute (later renamed the Weber Research Institute in his honor). Weber was also the first president of the Institute of Electrical and Electronics Engineers (IEEE) and one of the founders of the U.S. National Academy of Engineering (NAE).

Education and early years in Austria and Germany
Weber was born in Vienna, Austria. In 1924 he graduated with an engineering degree, and started working for the Siemens-Schuckert company as electrical engineer, initially in Vienna. In the meantime he studied further and earned two doctorates, a Ph.D. in 1926 from the University of Vienna and a Sc.D. in 1927 from the Technical University of Vienna. Early 1929 he moved to Siemens-Schuckert headquarters in Berlin, Germany and started teaching at the Technical University of Berlin.

Awards and honors
Ernst Weber received several awards and honors, including:
 The U.S. President's Certificate of Merit from President Harry S. Truman in 1948
 The AIEE Education Medal in 1960, "for excellence as a teacher in science and electrical engineering, for creative contributions in research and development, for broad professional and administrative leadership and in all for a considerate approach to human relations"
 Eta Kappa Nu naming him an Eminent Member in 1962
 The IEEE Founders Medal in 1971, "for leadership in the advancement of the electrical and electronics engineering profession in the fields of education, engineering societies, industry and government"
 The Microwave Career Award from the IEEE Microwave Theory and Techniques Society in 1977
 The U.S. National Medal of Science from President Ronald Reagan in 1987
 To honor him, IEEE renamed in 1996 the IEEE Engineering Leadership Recognition Award to IEEE Ernst Weber Engineering Leadership Recognition.

Books

References

1901 births
1996 deaths
Founding members of the United States National Academy of Engineering
Polytechnic Institute of New York University faculty
Presidents of the IEEE
Fellows of the American Physical Society
Austrian emigrants to the United States